Amphidromus cognatus (cognate land snail) is a large camaenid land snail endemic to Australia.

Taxonomy 
Its subgeneric placement is Incertae sedis.

Description
Amphidromus cognatus is large, with a shell length ranging from 21–33 mm (0.8–1.3 inches) and a diameter of 12–17 mm (0.5–0.7 inches). The ground colour of its shell is yellow, often with a peripheral spiral brown band, a purplish apical suffusion and a light yellow or white lip.

Distribution
Amphidromus cognatus has only been found in a restricted geographic range in Australia's Northern Territory.

The snail was first described in 1907, from three specimens found at Port Essington on the Cobourg Peninsula before 1850, although it was not found there since. Several sightings were made between 1976 and 1980, at one site on Bathurst Island and three sites at Melville Island.

Conservation status
Amphidromus cognatus is considered Endangered by the IUCN (World Conservation Union). The species is not listed on the Australian government's list of threatened fauna, but the Northern Territory government considers it Vulnerable.

References

 Fulton, H. C. (1907). Descriptions of new species of Trochomorpha, Cochlostyla, Amphidromus, Bulimulus, Drymæus, Placostylus, Stenogyra, Leptopoma, Cyclophorus, Cyclotus, and Alycæus. Annals and Magazine of Natural History, Series 7. 19(110): 149-157

External links
  Solem, A. (1983). First record of Amphidromus from Australia, with anatomical notes on several species (Mollusca: Pulmonata: Camaenidae). Records of the Australian Museum, 35 (4): 153-166

cognatus
Endemic fauna of Australia
Gastropods described in 1907
Taxonomy articles created by Polbot